Cretan War may refer to multiple wars involving the island of Crete, including:

Cretan War (205–200 BC), a war between King Philip V of Macedon and Rhodes
Cretan War (1645–69), a war between the Republic of Venice and the Ottoman Empire

See also
Cretan Revolt (disambiguation), various uprisings on Crete
Battle of Crete, a battle of World War II